Telicota anisodesma, the large darter or southern large darter, is a butterfly of the family Hesperiidae. It is found in Australia along the south-eastern coast of New South Wales and the north-eastern coast of Queensland.

The wingspan is about 30 mm.

The larvae feed on various rainforest species, including Flagellaria indica. They live in a cylindrical shelter made by rolling a leaf tip, leaving an entrance at the bottom.

External links
Australian Insects
Australian Faunal Directory

Taractrocerini
Butterflies described in 1911